Augen Bluffs is a group of rock bluffs between Orr Peak and Isocline Hill along the west side of Marsh Glacier, in the Miller Range of Antarctica. They were so named by the Ohio State University Geological Party, 1967–68, because rocks of the locality include augen gneiss.

References
 

Cliffs of Oates Land